The Division of Ballarat (spelt Ballaarat from 1901 until the 1977 election) is an Australian electoral division in the state of Victoria. The division was proclaimed in 1900, and was one of the original 65 divisions to be contested at the first federal election. It was named for the provincial city of the same name by Scottish squatter Archibald Yuille, who established the first settlement − his sheep run called Ballaarat − in 1837, with the name derived from a local Wathawurrung word for the area, balla arat, thought to mean "resting place".

The division currently takes in the regional City of Ballarat and the smaller towns of Bacchus Marsh, Ballan, Blackwood, Buninyong, Clunes, Creswick, Daylesford, Myrniong and Trentham and part of Burrumbeet.

The current Member for Ballarat, since the 2001 federal election, is Catherine King, a member of the Australian Labor Party.

Geography
Since 1984, federal electoral division boundaries in Australia have been determined at redistributions by a redistribution committee appointed by the Australian Electoral Commission. Redistributions occur for the boundaries of divisions in a particular state, and they occur every seven years, or sooner if a state's representation entitlement changes or when divisions of a state are malapportioned.

History

At various times in its existence the division has included other towns such as Ararat, Maryborough, and Stawell.

Ballarat used to be a marginal seat, changing hands at intervals between the Labor Party and the non-Labor parties. Unlike most marginal seats, it was not a barometer for winning government; since 1955, all but one of its members has spent at least one term in opposition.

Its most prominent member has been Alfred Deakin, who was Prime Minister of Australia three times. Liberal senator Michael Ronaldson was the grandson of Archibald Fisken, a former Member for Ballarat.

Ballarat also holds the distinction of seeing the closest seat result in Australian history. Nationalist Edwin Kerby unseated Labor incumbent Charles McGrath by a single vote in 1919. However, McGrath alleged irregularities, and the result was thrown out in 1920, forcing a by-election that was won by McGrath.

Since 2001, the seat has been held by Catherine King, a member of the Australian Labor Party. It has been a safe Labor seat since 2007 except for a 6.8 percent swing towards the Liberal Party at the 2013 election turning it marginal for one term.

Members

Election results

References

External links
 Division of Ballarat – Australian Electoral Commission

Electoral divisions of Australia
Constituencies established in 1901
1901 establishments in Australia
Ballarat